The Frimley Lodge Miniature Railway is operated by the Frimley and Ascot Locomotive Club and is located within Frimley Lodge Park, Surrey.
The railway consists of two tracks, a ground level and an elevated track.

Tracks

The journey takes about 5 minutes and is an attraction to young and old alike.

References

External links
Details of the line

Tourist attractions in Surrey
Miniature railways in the United Kingdom